Barrackpore may refer to:

Places

India
Barrackpore, city
Barrackpore subdivision, an administrative division in North 24 Parganas district in the state of West Bengal
Barrackpore I, a community development block in North 24 Parganas district in the state of West Bengal
Barrackpore II, a community development block in North 24 Parganas district in the state of West Bengal
Barrackpore (Lok Sabha constituency), a parliamentary constituency in North 24 Parganas district in the state of West Bengal
Barrackpore (Vidhan Sabha constituency), an assembly constituency in North 24 Parganas district in the state of West Bengal
Barrackpore mutiny of 1824
Barrackpore Police Commissionerate
Barrackpore railway station
Barrackpore Trunk Road
North Barrackpur
New Barrackpore

Trinidad and Tobago
Barrackpore, Trinidad and Tobago